Quzhd (also Romanized as Qūzhd; also known as Sarqodzhd) is a village in Howmeh Rural District, in the Central District of Gonabad County, Razavi Khorasan Province, Iran. At the 2006 census, its population was 1,411, in 437 families.

References 

Populated places in Gonabad County